Sachin Peiris (born 7 October 1992) is a Sri Lankan cricketer. He made his first-class debut for Saracens Sports Club in the 2010–11 Premier Trophy on 25 March 2011. He made his List A debut for Badureliya Sports Club in the 2012–13 Premier Limited Overs Tournament on 15 December 2012. He made his Twenty20 debut for Badureliya Sports Club in the 2015-16 AIA Premier T20 Tournament on 22 December 2015.

References

External links
 

1992 births
Living people
Sri Lankan cricketers
Badureliya Sports Club cricketers
Saracens Sports Club cricketers
Sri Lanka Police Sports Club cricketers
Cricketers from Colombo